The Winnipeg Grain Exchange (Known too as ICE Futures Canada) was established in 1887, and dissolved in 1986.
It was also the predecessor of the Winnipeg Commodity Exchange.

List of presidents 
This table represents the list of presidents of the exchange.
The exchange had 97 presidents, Of which:
 The first chairman is Daniel Hunter McMillan;
 The last chairman is C. Swartz;

References 

Organizations based in Winnipeg